Juliet Murphy (born 1980 in Donoughmore, County Cork) is an Irish sportsperson. She plays ladies' Gaelic football with her local club Donoughmore and has been a member of the Cork county ladies' football team at senior level since 1995. Murphy captained Cork to the All-Ireland titles in 2005, 2006 and 2007. Her greatest feat was during the 2013 All-Ireland Championship when she came out of retirement to help Cork overcome fancied teams such as Dublin, Kerry and Monaghan and brought the Brendan Martin Cup back to Leeside for the 8th time in 9 years.

References

 

1980 births
Living people
Cork inter-county ladies' footballers
Winners of four All-Ireland medals (ladies' football)
Ireland women's international rules football team players